Phillip Michael Gerard (aka Mike) is a character in the TV series Twin Peaks, portrayed by Al Strobel.

Character overview
Mike is an inhabiting spirit similar to the primary villain of the series, Bob (Frank Silva), who was his partner in serial murder. After committing several rape/murders with Bob, Mike had a religious epiphany and repented, cutting off his own arm to rid himself of a tattoo that read "Fire Walk With Me", which symbolized being touched by "The devilish one". Bob had an identical tattoo on his arm. Bob, however, would not repent. Mike has spent years trying to find and stop Bob.

In contrast with Bob, Mike only ever appears in the visual form of his host, traveling shoe salesman Phillip Michael Gerard. Gerard lost his arm in a car accident. He also had a tattoo of the word "mom" on his arm.

Television series
After FBI Special Agent Dale Cooper (Kyle MacLachlan) comes to Twin Peaks to investigate the murder of Laura Palmer (Sheryl Lee), Mike appears to Cooper in a dream, explaining his and Bob's history, but in a way that is not immediately clear. He shows Cooper a vision of Bob as he appeared in life. Later, Cooper, Deputy Hawk (Michael Horse), and Sheriff Harry Truman (Michael Ontkean) locate Philip Gerard, who is at the time unable to give them any information. Later, in the show's second season, Mike is key to solving Laura Palmer's murder.

Prequel film
In the prequel film Twin Peaks: Fire Walk with Me, during a scene taking place in the Black Lodge, The Man From Another Place (Michael J. Anderson) confronts Cooper and asks, "Do you know who I am?" Cooper shakes his head, and The Man From Another Place responds, "I am the arm". This gives the indication that he is the arm that Mike removed in order to get rid of the tattoo that linked him with Bob on the left shoulder.

Mike also harasses Leland Palmer (Ray Wise), Bob's host, in a road rage incident where he accuses Leland of "stealing the corn", and that "the thread will be torn." Before driving away, Mike tries to tell Laura that Leland is indeed Bob's host.

The film reveals that Mike was present on the night of Laura's murder and was, unintentionally, the reason Ronette Pulaski (Phoebe Augustine) survived and escaped; he had tracked Bob down and his efforts to enter the train car (in which Laura and Ronette had been raped), led to Ronette falling through the momentarily opened door. Bob swiftly shut the door again, denying Mike any chance of saving Laura's life, but as Bob closed the door, Mike threw the Owl Ring into the train car, which Laura put on, preventing Bob from possessing her (as he had originally intended).

At the end of the film, after Leland murders Laura, he enters the Black Lodge and sits beside Mike, Bob and the Man From Another Place.

Revived series
In the 2017 revived series, Mike appears once again in the Black Lodge as a sort of guide for Cooper, who is transported back into the real world after being imprisoned in the alternate dimension for 25 years.

Twin Peaks characters
Fictional amputees
Fictional demons and devils
Fictional characters with dissociative identity disorder
Fictional characters with spirit possession or body swapping abilities
Fictional serial killers
Fictional rapists
Television characters introduced in 1990
Male characters in television